Pierre-Henri Lamy (born August 17, 1987 in Château-Gontier) is a French professional footballer.

He began football at ES Quelaines before joining Ancienne Château-Gontier. 
Lamy played on the professional level in Ligue 2 for Stade Lavallois and Angers SCO.

External links
 
 Pierre-Henri Lamy profile at foot-national.com

1987 births
Living people
French footballers
Ligue 2 players
Stade Lavallois players
Racing Besançon players
Louhans-Cuiseaux FC players
Angers SCO players
Chamois Niortais F.C. players
Vendée Poiré-sur-Vie Football players
People from Château-Gontier
Association football defenders
Sportspeople from Mayenne
Footballers from Pays de la Loire